Inge Schneider-Gabriel is a retired German rower who won a gold, a silver and a bronze medal in the quadruple sculls at the European championships of 1966, 1968 and 1969, respectively. After marrying between 1966 and 1968, she changed her last name from Gabriel to Schneider-Gabriel.

References

Year of birth missing (living people)
Living people
East German female rowers
European Rowing Championships medalists